Bəxtiyar Bəyqulu oğlu Həsənalızadə (born on 29 December 1992) is an Azerbaijani footballer who plays as a defender for Sabah FC in the Azerbaijan Premier League.

Club career
Həsənalızadə made his debut in the Azerbaijan Premier League for Sumgayit on 18 March 2012, match against Kapaz.

On 24 December 2020, Həsənalızadə signed for Sabah FC until the end of the 2020–21 season.

References

External links
 

1992 births
Living people
Association football defenders
Azerbaijani footballers
Azerbaijan youth international footballers
Azerbaijan under-21 international footballers
Azerbaijan Premier League players
Sumgayit FK players
Zira FK players